San Valentino is a village in Tuscany, central Italy, administratively a frazione of the comune of Sorano, province of Grosseto, in the tuff area of southern Maremma. At the time of the 2001 census, its population was 58.

The village depended on the castle of Fregiano in the Middle Ages. The territory of San Valentino includes the hamlets of Casetta, Case Rocchi, Pratolungo, Valle Castagneta and is known for the presence of Etruscan ruins dating from the 3rd century BC.

Main sights 
 San Valentino (15th century), the main parish church of the village. It was originally built as a chapel and then restructured in the early 20th century.
 Chapel of Santissima Trinità (18th century), a little chapel in the hamlet of Pratolungo.
 Fregiano Castle (14th century), now in ruins.

References

Bibliography 
  Emanuele Repetti, «San Valentino», Dizionario Geografico Fisico Storico della Toscana, 1833–1846.
 Carlo Citter, Guida agli edifici sacri della Maremma, Siena, Nuova Immagine Editrice, 2002.

See also 
 Castell'Ottieri
 Cerreto, Sorano
 Elmo, Sorano
 Montebuono, Sorano
 Montevitozzo
 Montorio, Sorano
 San Giovanni delle Contee
 San Quirico, Sorano
 Sovana

Frazioni of Sorano